Newshour is BBC World Service's flagship international news and current affairs radio programme, which is broadcast twice daily: weekdays at 1400, weekends at 1300 and nightly at 2100 (UK time). There is also an additional online programme at 20:00 on weekdays. occasionally the programme can run for three hours during major breaking stories such as Russia's Invasion of Ukraine. Each edition lasts one hour. It consists of news bulletins on the hour and half hour, international interviews and in-depth reports of world news. The BBC World Service considers it one of their most important programmes. In 2011 it was kept as one of four key outlets, despite severe cutbacks. It is also broadcast in the United States on various American Public Media stations. The programme is broadcast live from Broadcasting House in London. It covers the major news of the day, often interviewing heads of state and government ministers.

History
The programme was first broadcast in 1988.

Presenters

Current

On weekdays the 14:00 & 21:00 GMT editions are presented by different presenters where as on weekends they are presented by the same presenter

Past
 Owen Bennett-Jones
 Claire Bolderson, 1997–2012
 Robin Lustig, 1989–2012
 Mary Ann Sieghart, 2008–10
 Paul Welsh
 Judy Swallow
 Alex Brodie
 Philippa Thomas 200?-21
 Nick Worrall, 1988 - ?
 Oliver Scott, 1988 - ?
 Hugh Prysor-Jones, 1988 - ?
 Geoffrey Stern, 1988 - ?
 Max Pearson

See also

 BBC World Service, the home of Newshour
 BBC News
 BBC World News, The BBC's International Television Station

References

External links
 

Newshour
BBC news radio programmes